Minxiong is a railway station on the Taiwan Railways Administration West Coast line located in Minxiong Township, Chiayi County, Taiwan.

History

The station was originally opened on 15 December 1903. The station got its new building on 23 October 2009 and was officially opened on 12 January 2010.

Around the station 
 Chiahui Power Plant
 Chiayi Performing Arts Center
 National Radio Museum
 WuFeng University

See also
 List of railway stations in Taiwan

1903 establishments in Taiwan
Railway stations in Chiayi County
Railway stations opened in 1903
Railway stations served by Taiwan Railways Administration